This is a list of international football games played by the Nigeria national football team from 2010 to 2019.

During the decade, Nigeria played in several international tournaments and friendly matches. In the FIFA World Cup, they placed bottom in Group B in 2010, reached the Round of 16 in 2014, and placed third in Group D in 2018. The team entered the Africa Cup of Nations in 2010 (third place), 2013 (winners) and 2019 (third place). Nigeria also finished in third place at the African Nations Championship in 2014 and as runners-up in 2018.

2010

2011

2012

2013

2014

2015

2016

2017

2018

2019

References

External links
 Nigeria: Fixtures and Results - FIFA.com
 Nigeria national football team complete 'A' international record - 11v11.com

2010s in Nigeria
2010-2019
2009–10 in Nigerian football
2010–11 in Nigerian football
2011–12 in Nigerian football
2012–13 in Nigerian football
2013–14 in Nigerian football
2014–15 in Nigerian football
2015–16 in Nigerian football
2016–17 in Nigerian football
2017–18 in Nigerian football
2018–19 in Nigerian football
2019–20 in Nigerian football